Todd Andrew Schnitt (born January 24, 1966) is an American conservative talk radio host. He currently hosts The Schnitt Show, the afternoon drive time show whose flagship is Tampa radio station 1010 WHFS AM and is nationally syndicated by Compass Media Networks. He also relaunched the "MJ Morning Show" in October 2020 on "Q105," 104.7 WRBQ-FM in Tampa. He co-hosted a morning drive talk show on WOR New York with Len Berman from January 2015 until October 19, 2017.

Schnitt was born in New York City and raised in Nanuet, New York, and Virginia Beach, Virginia. He is a graduate of Frank W. Cox High School in Virginia Beach. He has worked in radio since he was 16 and has used the stage name MJ Kelli in hosting shows at the Hampton Roads, New York City, and Tampa markets from 1986 to 2012 and beginning again in October 2020. From 1994 to 2012, Schnitt was morning drive time host of The MJ Morning Show (known before 2001 as The MJ and BJ Morning Show) at Tampa top 40 station WFLZ-FM and select other Clear Channel Communications stations. In 2001, Schnitt launched an afternoon talk program The Schnitt Show on Miami radio station WIOD. The Schnitt Show later expanded to other markets, including Tampa station WFLA in 2002.  The show now airs live on Money Talk 1010 WHFS from 3-6 p.m. Eastern.

Early life and broadcast career beginnings
Schnitt was born in Manhattan and grew up in Nanuet, New York. Schnitt has credited New York City station MusicRadio 77 WABC with his interest in radio broadcasting.  As a young boy growing up in Nanuet, New York in the early 1970s, Schnitt became fascinated by WABC and listened as much as possible.  In late 1976, Schnitt's family moved to Virginia Beach, Virginia.

In 1982, at the age of 16, Schnitt landed his first part-time job at WCPK in Chesapeake, Virginia.  During his high school years he worked at numerous Hampton Roads, Virginia, area stations including WVAB, WNIS and WNVZ (Z-104).  Schnitt attended Ithaca College in New York and worked at the Cornell student-run station, WVBR.

In 1986, he returned to the Hampton Roads area and scored his first full-time radio job at WRSR-FM (97Star), which soon reverted to the  call letters WGH-FM.  The name MJ Kelli was first used at WGH-FM.  The name MJ was created because the 97Star program director was adamant that Todd Schnitt  was  not a good radio name.

In 1988, Schnitt was recruited to leave WGH-FM (97 Star) and cross the street to Top 40 rival radio station WNVZ-FM (Z104) because Schnit's 6-10 p.m. Eastern nighttime show on WGH was the only show beating WNVZ in the nighttime ratings

In 1989, after just a little over a year at WNVZ, Schnitt was hired by Scott Shannon at Pirate Radio, KQLZ in Los Angeles as creative director, assistant program director and morning show cast member.  Schnitt later rejoined Shannon at the revamping of WPLJ, New York which had originally signed on as Mojo Radio in April, 1991.

Schnitt left New York City in October 1992 to start The MJ Kelli Morning Show, his first morning-drive program (6-10 a.m.) on WOVV (Star 95.5), West Palm Beach, Florida.  In February 1994, he was brought to Tampa, Florida to anchor the new morning show on WFLZ-FM (The Power Pig).  Schnitt was teamed up with BJ Harris, the Power Pig's program director, to form the MJ and BJ Morning Show.  Harris left the show on February 7, 2001.  The show was renamed The MJ Morning Show.

The MJ Morning Show
Schnitt hosted The MJ Morning Show under his "MJ" personality. The show was broadcast Monday through Friday 6-10 am on flagship WFLZ-FM—Tampa and syndicated to KSLZ—St. Louis (Z107.7), WKSL—Jacksonville, Florida and WFKS—Melbourne, Florida (95.1 KISS-FM).  The show focused on current events, lifestyle news, pop-culture and personal experiences.  The program had been mostly a talk format but played about two songs per hour.

Schnitt relaunched the "MJ Morning Show" in Tampa on October 5, 2020, on 104.7 WRBQ-FM with returning cast members Fester and Froggy along with newcomer Roxanne Wilder.

During the original run of the morning show, Schnitt's Tampa-area rival was Bubba the Love Sponge Clem, morning host at rock stations WXTB and later WHPT. In March 2008, Schnitt sued Clem for defamation of him and his wife. A Jury found Clem "not guilty" on all counts. The Schnitts subsequently refused to pay the remainder of their attorneys’ fees, after paying roughly $1 million.  In March 2016, a jury partially sided with the Schnitts’ former legal firm and awarded the firm an additional $669,200.

It was announced on January 19, 2012, that Todd Schnitt would be doing the last "MJ morning show" broadcast on February 17, 2012. He continued hosting his political talk show The Schnitt Show, which broadcasts afternoons.

In October 2019, Schnitt teamed up with two former members of the show, Fester and Froggy, to launch an "MJ Morning Show Reunion Podcast" which was discontinued in November 2020 after the live morning show was relaunched the month prior on WRBQ-FM. He also started a podcast with Fark.com founder Drew Curtis called "Fark and Schnitt" in September 2019 and discontinued it in the summer of 2020.

The Schnitt Show
The Schnitt Show is a conservative radio talk show that airs Monday through Friday from 3-6 p.m. Eastern. It is based from Tampa's Money Talk 1010 WHFS and also airs on 92.1 and 103. 1FM in the Tampa/St. Petersburg area. Schnitt describes himself as a "fiercely independent conservative with libertarian influence."  The show consists of news, political commentary, lifestyle and pop-culture with sound bites and parody material.  The Schnitt Show is syndicated by Compass Media Networks  and is heard on nearly 60 stations across America.

The program first launched on October 1, 2001, on WIOD in Miami. After Glenn Beck left WFLA, Schnitt took over the 3-6 p.m. slot on 970 WFLA in Tampa starting January 3, 2002.

In 2013, The Schnitt Show was moved to  1250 WHNZ (a mostly infomercial station) when the higher rated Sean Hannity Show took over the time slot. WHNZ became the live flagship station of the program. It's the lowest rated conservative program in the Tampa Bay market.

In October 2020, the show was not renewed with Clearchannel.  It was picked up by Money Talk 1010 WHFS in Tampa.  Schnitt joined WRBQ-FM to relaunch the "MJ Morning Show" and now works for Beasley Media Group.

Personal life
Todd Schnitt is married to Michelle Schnitt, an attorney and former Hillsborough County prosecutor. They have two children and two Jack Russell Terriers. Schnitt is also a self-described automobile enthusiast and an avid scuba diver and skier.

Schnitt is a 2007 graduate of the Tampa FBI Citizens Academy, an invitation-only program offered by numerous FBI field offices around the country. In that same year, Schnitt flew with the Blue Angels in a two-seater F/A-18 Hornet jet #7 from their NAS Pensacola headquarters (video).

Schnitt has also experienced a jet-assisted takeoff (JATO) in "Fat Albert," the Blue Angels' C-130T Hercules transport at MacDill Air Force Base in Tampa.

References

1966 births
Living people
American talk radio hosts
American libertarians
Florida Republicans
Newsmax TV people
Radio personalities from Tampa, Florida
People from Nanuet, New York
Ithaca College alumni
People from Virginia Beach, Virginia
Radio personalities from Virginia
Radio personalities from New York City